cis-Abienol synthase (EC 4.2.3.140, Z-abienol synthase, CAS, ABS) is an enzyme with systematic name (13E)-8α-hydroxylabd-13-en-15-yl-diphosphate-lyase (cis-abienol forming). This enzyme catalyses the following chemical reaction

 (13E)-8α-hydroxylabd-13-en-15-yl diphosphate  cis-abienol + diphosphate

This enzyme is isolated from the plants Abies balsamea (balsam fir) and Nicotiana tabacum (tobacco).

References

External links 
 

EC 4.2.3